Gradec or Gradets may refer to:

Albania 
 Gradec, Gjerbës, a village in the administrative unit Gjerbës, Skrapar municipality, Berat County
 Gradec, Qendër Skrapar, a village in the administrative unit Qendër Skrapar, Skrapar municipality, Berat County
 Gradec, Dibër, a village in the municipality of Dibër, Dibër County
 Gradec, Shkodër, a village in the municipality of Malësi e Madhe, Shkodër County

Austria 
 Graz

Bulgaria 
 Gradets, Sliven Province
 Polski Gradets, Stara Zagora Province

Croatia 
 Gradec, Zagreb, a neighborhood
 Gradec, Zagreb County, a village and a municipality
 Gradec Pokupski

North Macedonia 
 Gradec, Kriva Palanka
 Gradec, Valandovo
 Gradec, Vinica
 Gradec, Vrapčište

Slovenia 
 Gradec, Črnomelj, now part of Rožič Vrh
 Gradec, Krško
 Gradec, Litija
 Gradec, Pivka
 Marija Gradec, in the Municipality of Laško
 Polhov Gradec, the administrative seat of the Municipality of Dobrova–Polhov Gradec
 Pusti Gradec, in the Municipality of Črnomelj
 Slovenj Gradec, a town in northern Slovenia, the administrative seat of the Municipality of Slovenj Gradec

See also 
 Hradec (disambiguation) (in Czech place names)
 Gradac (disambiguation)